Germany was represented by Danish singer Gitte, with the song "Junger Tag", at the 1973 Eurovision Song Contest, which took place on 7 April in Luxembourg City. "Junger Tag" was the winner of the German national final, Ein Lied für Luxemburg, held on 21 February.

Before Eurovision

Ein Lied für Luxemburg
The final was held at the TV studios in Frankfurt, hosted by Edith Grobleben. Six acts took part, each performing two songs. Songs were voted on by a 10-member jury who each awarded between 1 and 5 points per song. Unlike in the previous year's final, the result of which had caused a degree of controversy, there was no elimination and revote on the top songs. "Junger Tag" emerged the winner by just 1 point over "Sebastian" performed by Tonia, who had been the Belgian Eurovision representative in 1966.

At Eurovision 
On the night of the final Gitte performed 4th in the running order, following Portugal and preceding Norway. At the close of voting "Junger Tag" had received 85 points, placing Germany joint 8th (with Monaco) of the 17 entries.

Voting

References 

1973
Countries in the Eurovision Song Contest 1973
Eurovision